Coryphaeschna is a genus of pilot darners in the dragonfly family Aeshnidae. There are about 10 described species in Coryphaeschna.

Species
These 10 species belong to the genus Coryphaeschna:
 Coryphaeschna adnexa (Hagen, 1861) (blue-faced darner)
 Coryphaeschna amazonica De Marmels, 1989
 Coryphaeschna apeora Paulson, 1994
 Coryphaeschna diapyra Paulson, 1994
 Coryphaeschna huaorania Tennessen, 2001
 Coryphaeschna ingens (Rambur, 1842) (regal darner)
 Coryphaeschna longfieldae Kimmins
 Coryphaeschna perrensi (McLachlan, 1887)
 Coryphaeschna secreta Calvert
 Coryphaeschna viriditas Calvert, 1952 (mangrove darner)

References

Further reading

External links

 

Aeshnidae
Articles created by Qbugbot